Kenneth Alan Grieve (17 March 1942 – 15 November 2016) was a Scottish television director. Originally a cameraman, he moved into directing and began his career with Coronation Street.

Early life and education

Grieve was born and brought up in Edinburgh, the son of Henry Grieve, a plant manager at British Aluminium, and his wife, Lesley, a seamstress. He also had an older brother named Robin. He attended the Edinburgh Academy, where he excelled in geography and history, and won a scholarship to Bryanston School in Dorset.

Career

His first job was as a trainee studio cameraman with Granada Television. He became one of its elite crew, strong and skilled enough to manoeuvre the huge cameras on live pop shows. He later further trained as a director of dramas and documentaries, working on Coronation Street and Crown Court in the mid-1970s. He subsequently directed the 1979 Doctor Who serial Destiny of the Daleks for the BBC, and episodes of The Bill and Peak Practice. In 1988, he shared the direction of Game, Set and Match with Patrick Lau. In 2007, he directed the Casualty episode Stormy Weather.

Other work
In 1975, he directed the location footage of Coronation Street that was used for the opening titles until 1990. He recorded a commentary for the DVD of Destiny of the Daleks with actors Lalla Ward and David Gooderson, which was released in 2007.

Personal life

Grieve had four children with his wife, Fiona. They remained together until her death in 2010.

Through working with Douglas Adams on Destiny of the Daleks, they struck up a friendship that would last Adams' lifetime.

In the mid 1990s, Grieve returned to base himself in Edinburgh and lived in Marchmont. In 2009 he was diagnosed with myeloma and had to withdraw from a film production with Hugh Laurie. He mentored young aspiring film makers at the Edinburgh Filmhouse's youth film group Scottish Kids Are Making Movies (SKAMM).

Television

References

External links 

 

1942 births
2016 deaths
Scottish television directors
Deaths from multiple myeloma
Television people from Edinburgh